Richard Wilmot DD (1703–1772) was a Canon of Windsor from 1748 to 1772.

Family

He was the son of Robert Wilmot of Osmaston Hall, Derbyshire.

Career

He was educated at St John's College, Cambridge and was awarded BA in 1725, MA in 1728 and DD in 1744.

He was appointed:
Rector of Trusley, Derbyshire 1733 - 1738
Vicar of Mickleover, Derbyshire 1740 - 1772
Rector of Morley, Derbyshire 1740 - 1772
Chaplain to the Bishop of Bangor
Rector of St Benet Fink, London 1763 - 1772

He was appointed to the ninth stall in St George's Chapel, Windsor Castle in 1748, a position he held until 1772.

Notes 

1703 births
1772 deaths
Canons of Windsor
Alumni of St John's College, Cambridge
People from Osmaston, Derby